Thohoyandou Stadium is a multi-purpose stadium in the town of Thohoyandou, in the province of Limpopo, South Africa.  It is currently used mostly for football matches, and is the home stadium of Venda Football Academy F.C. football club. The stadium has a capacity of 20,000 people. The stadium was also used by Tshakhuma Tsha Madzivhandila (TTM) before it was sold to a Gauteng- based businessman and moved home ground matches to Peter Mokaba Stadium.

It was not used for about 8 years until 2014 when Black Leopards started using it again as their home ground.

References

Soccer venues in South Africa
Sports venues in Limpopo
Thohoyandou
Multi-purpose stadiums in South Africa
Black Leopards F.C.